Saint Stephen's Gate may refer to either of two gates of Jerusalem:

Damascus Gate prior to the 14th century
Lions' Gate since the 14th century